Paul Keenan may refer to:

 Paul Keenan (composer) (1956–2001), British contemporary classical composer
 Paul Keenan (songwriter) (born 1976), Scottish songwriter and producer
 Paul Keenan (The Inbetweeners), a fictional character